Vivergo Fuels is a bio-ethanol producer, headquartered in Hessle, East Riding of Yorkshire, but whose plant is based at Salt End, Kingston upon Hull, England. The company produces bio-fuels from locally sourced wheat and besides producing bio-ethanol, a by-product of animal feed is also part of the bio-fuel process. The company's plant was subject to a shutdown between November 2017 and April 2018 whilst demand for their product was low. The company blamed the United Kingdom government for not ruling that bio-fuel additives to petrol should be greater than 4.75%.

It is the largest manufacturer of bio-ethanol in the United Kingdom and the second largest producer in Europe.

History
Vivergo was first proposed in 2007 as a joint venture between AB Sugar, BP and DuPont. The company had £350 million ($400 million) invested into it and opened for business in July 2013, with both AB Sugar and BP taking a 47% share and DuPont the remaining 6%. In May 2015, BP pulled out of the venture and sold its stake to AB Sugar, giving them 94% of the company.

The construction phase was beset by industrial action in March 2011; Vivergo had employed a company to build the plant, but it was behind schedule and so fired the company and sought another contractor to complete the task. This left 400 workers unemployed and the GMB union believed that Vivergo should continue to employ the workers whilst the search for a new contractor was completed. Redhall, a Wakefield-based company, was awarded the £18 million contract to design and build the plant in February 2010. The project was to have been completed by the end of 2010, but by the time of the industrial action, it was four months behind schedule. Redhall later successfully sued Vivergo for breach of contract.

The wheat is sourced from over 900 farms across Yorkshire and Lincolnshire with the bulk coming from the East Riding of Yorkshire. Wheat sourced from this region is high in starch which makes it ideal to process into bio-ethanol. The animal feed is sold on to over 800 farms across the United Kingdom. When the plant was opened, Frontier Agriculture had an exclusive contract to supply the transport from farms to the Vivergo plant.

The plant was deliberately located on the Humber Estuary to take advantage of the ability of the east coast ports to export bulk liquids via ship-borne transport. Its location close to the major wheat producing areas in eastern England made it ideal. This makes Vivergo the largest producer of bio-ethanol in the United Kingdom and the second largest producer in Europe.

Closure
In November 2017, the plant was subject to an enforced closure by the company. Vivergo claimed that the business was unsustainable due to the government not adhering to its own Renewable Transport Fuel Obligation (RTFO) policy. Currently, the company produces E5, an up 5% blending product that is meant to be mixed with petrol in a 5:95% mix. Vivergo wish to produce E10, this would see an increase from 4.75% bio-fuels additives into petrol to 9.75% by 2020. After some government debate and agreement, the RTFO was adopted by the government, and was implemented in April 2018. The plant re-opened for business in April 2018 with E10 becoming law by 2020.

References

External links
Vivergo facts page

Alcohol fuel producers
Chemical plants
Manufacturing plants in England